Carcajou is an alternative common name for the wolverine, Gulo gulo. It may also refer to:

Places
Canada
Carcajou, Alberta, an unincorporated community
Carcajou Pass a mountain pass

United States
Carcajou, Wisconsin, an unincorporated community
Carcajou Lake, a lake in Montana